Warsaw Voice: Polish and Central European Review, commonly shortened to The Warsaw Voice, is an English-language newspaper printed in Poland, concentrating on news about Poland and its neighbours. First released in October 1988, it is a general news magazine with sections on political, economic, social and cultural news and with opinions sections. The printed edition has a circulation of 10,500.

It has been described as "the most authorative English-language media published in Warsaw".

It was created by Polish tv-presenter and journalist Andrzej Jonas. Jonas served as editor-in-chief with Slawomir Majman as deputy editor in chief.

For the first few years of its history, it was the only (and the first) English-language newspaper published in Poland.

Print characteristics
A4 format (230mm x 297 mm), 40 pages, minimum 24 pages in full colour.

References

External links 

Newspapers published in Warsaw
English-language newspapers published in Europe
Publications established in 1988
1988 establishments in Poland